Dragi Kaličanin (born 28 October 1957) is a Serbian football manager and former player.

Background and career
Born in Štavalj, Sjenica, in modern-day Serbia, he started and finished his playing career with FK Borac Čačak but his best years were spent while playing with Yugoslav First League giants FK Partizan and with Spanish La Liga club Real Zaragoza with whom he won the 1986 Copa del Rey. He also had short spells in Turkey and with another Yugoslav club, FK Priština.

References

External links
 

1957 births
Living people
People from Sjenica
Serbian footballers
Yugoslav footballers
Association football defenders
FK Borac Čačak players
FK Partizan players
FC Prishtina players
Yugoslav First League players
Real Zaragoza players
La Liga players
Expatriate footballers in Spain
Bursaspor footballers
Süper Lig players
Expatriate footballers in Turkey
Serbian football managers
FK Voždovac managers
FK Partizan non-playing staff